Pope Branch is a tributary stream of the Anacostia River in Washington, DC.

Water quality issues
Pope Branch is in a highly urbanized area and the stream has been polluted by urban runoff (stormwater) and leaking sewer pipes. 

The District of Columbia Department of Energy and Environment has conducted stream restoration projects in Pope Branch Park. Regenerative stormwater conveyances were installed to capture runoff from adjacent streets. The restoration work is designed to reduce erosion and pollutant discharges to the stream.

The District of Columbia Water and Sewer Authority (DC Water) completed repairs on the sewer line in 2014. It began stream restoration in the sewer line area in January 2016 and the work was scheduled for completion in October 2016.

See also
List of District of Columbia rivers

References

External links
 Anacostia Watershed Society
 Anacostia Watershed Restoration Partnership

Anacostia River
Rivers of Washington, D.C.